Xammes is a commune in the Meurthe-et-Moselle department in north-eastern France.

History
It may have been the village Scannis mentioned in charters since 776. The church of Saint-Clément dates back to the 12th century.

Population

See also
Communes of the Meurthe-et-Moselle department
Parc naturel régional de Lorraine

References

Communes of Meurthe-et-Moselle